Werner Stark (2 December 1909 – 4 October 1985) was a sociologist and economist, who made important contributions to the sociology of knowledge, the sociology of religion, and the history of economic thought.

Biography
Werner Stark was born in Marienbad, Austrian Empire (now in the Czech Republic), to parents of Jewish origin. His father, Adolf Stark, was a physician for a miners' union and a socialist city council member. His birth was registered by the rabbi of Marienbad, but he was raised as an atheist. After completing his secondary education in Marienbad, he enrolled in the University of Hamburg to study economics and social sciences. While there, he met his wife-to be, Kate Franck who was also a student at the University. He spent the 1930-31 session at the London School of Economics. Stark's training and scholarship encompassed history, philosophy, political science, law, economics, literature, art, music, and sociology. He held doctorates both in law and in political science. The rise of Nazism resulted in his leaving Germany for Prague in 1934, where he became a lecturer at the Prague School of Political Science.

In 1939, when the invading Nazis closed the university, Stark left for England, where he settled in Cambridge. He became interested in the economic writings of the philosopher Jeremy Bentham, and submitted three essays on the subject to John Maynard Keynes, editor of the Economic Journal: Keynes was impressed, and encouraged Stark to work further on the subject, and to produce an edition of Bentham's economic writings (eventually published under the auspices of the Royal Economic Society in three volumes in 1952–54). In 1941, influenced by the writings of John Henry Newman, Stark converted to Roman Catholicism. In 1944, he was called up to serve in the British Army, initially in the Pioneer Corps and afterwards in the Intelligence Corps.

After the war, Stark taught at British universities, including Cambridge, Edinburgh, and Manchester, until his acceptance in 1963 of a professorship at Fordham University, New York. He stayed at Fordham until his mandatory retirement in 1975, when he returned to Europe, holding an honorary professorship at the University of Salzburg, Austria, until his death there in 1985.

Stark was internationally recognized for work in the sociology of religion, social theory, and sociology of knowledge. His scholarship was consistently multidisciplinary, his research constantly nourished by his teaching. After his conversion, his adopted religion became an important influence in his life. Stark was distressed by what he considered religion's erosion in the modern world, strongly believing that religion provides guidelines for individual action that neither custom nor law can give. As he saw it, excessive individualism lay at the root of Christianity's contemporary crisis. He believed that modern intellectuals had been strongly affected by post-Renaissance rationalism, resulting in "a super-rationalism which tends to blind them towards many non-rational values, for instance, those of tradition, of religion, and even of art" (The Sociology of Knowledge, Routledge, 1958).

In the sociology of religion, Stark considered Max Weber's work a challenge of great importance, although he thought Weber lacked necessary insight into "true religiosity" (The Sociology of Religion, 5 volumes, Fordham University Press, 1966-1972). His international reputation was both reflected and built by translations of many of his works into Japanese, Italian, German, and Spanish. The Social Bond (6 volumes, Fordham University Press, 1976-1987) is considered by some critics to be definitive in establishing his intellectual legacy.

Major publications
 "Liberty and Equality, or: Jeremy Bentham as an Economist, I. Bentham's Doctrine", Economic Journal, vol. 51 (1941), pp. 56–79
 The Ideal Foundations of Economic Thought, 1943 (repr. 1975)
 The History of Economics in its Relation to Social Development, 1944
 "Jeremy Bentham as an Economist, II. Bentham's Influence", Economic Journal, vol. 56 (1946), pp. 583–608
 "Diminishing Utility Reconsidered", Kyklos, 1947
 America: Ideal and Reality (1947)
 "Stable Equilibrium Re-examined", Kyklos, 1947
 (edited) Jeremy Benthams Economics Writings (3 vols.), 1952–54
 The Sociology of Knowledge: An Essay in Aid of a Deeper Understanding of the History of Ideas, 1958
 "The 'Classical Situation' in Political Economy", Kyklos, 1959 
 The Fundamental Forms of Social Thought, 1963
 The Sociology of Religion (5 vols.), 1966–72
 The Social Bond (6 vols.), 1976–87
 History and Historians of Political Economy (ed. Charles M.A. Clark), 1994

References

Bibliography

1909 births
1985 deaths
Academics of the University of Cambridge
Academics of the University of Edinburgh
Academics of the Victoria University of Manchester
Alumni of the London School of Economics
Austrian economists
Austrian sociologists
Converts to Roman Catholicism from atheism or agnosticism
Converts to Roman Catholicism from Judaism
Fordham University faculty
Historians of economic thought
University of Hamburg alumni
20th-century Austrian  historians
People from Mariánské Lázně
Jewish emigrants from Austria to the United Kingdom after the Anschluss
British Army personnel of World War II
Royal Pioneer Corps soldiers
Intelligence Corps soldiers
Czechoslovak emigrants to the United Kingdom